, also known by the name H Zett M (stylised as H ZETT M) is a Japanese keyboardist and producer. He became a member of jazz instrumental band Pe'z in 1999, and was a member of Ringo Sheena's band Tokyo Jihen between 2004 and 2005. In 2007, Hiizumi debuted as a solo musician with the name H Zett M.

Biography 

In 2001, Pe'z debuted with their self-titled extended play Pe'z, followed by Hayato and Okokoroire also in 2001. Their major debut release with Toshiba EMI, Akatsuki, was released in 2002.

In 2003, Hiizumi joined musician Ringo Sheena as a tour musician for her 10 date Sugoroku Tour. This tour band, Tokyo Jihen, debuted as a fully fledged musical act in 2004 with the single "Gunjō Biyori", which Hiizumi composed. The band's debut album Kyōiku was released in November 2004, also featuring his songs "Genjitsu ni Oite" and "Service", followed by the Dynamite tour in early 2005. Hiizumi decided to leave the band after the tour to focus on his work with Pe'z, and announced this on July 1, 2005.

In 2007, Hiizumi made his solo debut with the album 5+2=11. He also worked in the musical collaboration between Pe'z and folk singer Suzumoku, Pe'zmoku, and performed the Bleach ending theme song "Gallop".

Hiizumi collaborated with Pe'z members Masahiro Nirehara and Kou to create the jazz trio H Zettrio in 2013, and released the album Mitsuboshi on December 4, 2013. H Zettrio further collaborated with jazz singer-songwriter Roco to create the unit Chazz. The unit recorded the album Chazz: Smile Music Life, a collection of songs famous in children's music, performed in a jazz style with new lyrics.

Names 

Hiizumi uses a variety of stage names for different musical projects. JASRAC lists his name with the kanji 樋泉昌之 in the composition credits for his early works for Pe'z, but as a member of Pe'z he lists his name as ヒイズミマサユ機. As a member of Tokyo Jihen, he originally went under the name ヒーズミマサユ季 when the band performed Shiina Ringo's Sugoroku Tour, and as  after the band's official debut. For his solo debut, he used the name H Zett M. On Shiina Ringo's live film Ringo Haku '14: Toshionna no Gyakushū, he is credited as Hiizumimasayu-KI.

Discography

Studio albums

Project albums

Singles

Video albums

Notes

References

External links 

 
BMG Japan label site

1978 births
Japanese jazz composers
Japanese jazz keyboardists
Japanese jazz musicians
Japanese jazz pianists
Japanese male pianists
Japanese male singer-songwriters
Japanese singer-songwriters
Japanese music arrangers
Living people
Male jazz composers
Male jazz pianists
Musicians from Kobe
Tokyo Jihen members
Vocaloid musicians